Karlapat Wildlife Sanctuary is a wildlife sanctuary located in Kalahandi district and a popular tourist attraction of Odisha in India. Karlapat Wildlife Sanctuary is about 15 km from Bhawanipatna, the district headquarters of Kalahandi district.

It lies within the Eastern Highlands moist deciduous forests ecoregion. Major plant communities include mixed deciduous forests and scrublands. The forest consists of flora like Sal, Bija, Asan, Harida, Amala, Bahada and Bamboo and varieties of medicinal plants.

This sanctuary is home to many wildlife species like tiger, leopard, sambar, nilgai, barking deer, mouse deer, a wide variety of birds like green munia, Great Eared-nightjar and various reptiles.

References 

Eastern Highlands moist deciduous forests
Wildlife sanctuaries in Odisha
Kalahandi district
1992 establishments in Orissa
Protected areas established in 1992